Neomicropteryx matsumurana is a species of moth belonging to the family Micropterigidae. It was described by Syuti Issiki in 1931. It is known from Japan.

The length of the forewings is 5.1-5.9 mm for males and 4.7-5.7 mm for females.

References

Micropterigidae
Moths described in 1931
Moths of Japan